Daisley is a surname. Notable people with the surname include:

Bob Daisley (born 1950), Australian musician, songwriter, and author
Paul Daisley (1957–2003), British politician
Stephen Daisley (born 1955), New Zealand novelist

See also
Dailey
Paisley (name)